Felimida ponga is a species of colourful sea slug, a dorid nudibranch, a marine gastropod mollusk in the family Chromodorididae.

Distribution

Description
The maximum recorded body length is 10 mm.

Habitat
Minimum recorded depth is 10 m. Maximum recorded depth is 10 m.

References

External links
 Johnson R.F. & Gosliner T.M. (2012) Traditional taxonomic groupings mask evolutionary history: A molecular phylogeny and new classification of the chromodorid nudibranchs. PLoS ONE 7(4): e33479

Chromodorididae
Gastropods described in 1970